This section of the list of rampage killers contains those cases, where soldiers willfully killed their own comrades.

A rampage killer has been defined as follows:

This list should contain every case with at least one of the following features:
 Rampage killings with six or more dead 
 Rampage killings with at least four people killed and least ten victims overall (dead plus injured)
 Rampage killings with at least two people killed and least 12 victims overall (dead plus injured)
 An incidence of rampage killing shall not be included in this list if it does not include at least two people killed.
 In all cases, the perpetrator(s) shall not be counted among those killed or injured.

All abbreviations used in the tables are explained below.


Rampage killers

Abbreviations and footnotes

W – A basic description of the weapons used in the murders
F – Firearms and other ranged weapons, especially rifles and handguns, but also bows and crossbows, grenade launchers, flamethrowers, or slingshots
M – Melee weapons, like knives, swords, spears, machetes, axes, clubs, rods, stones, or bare hands
O – Any other weapons, such as bombs, hand grenades, Molotov cocktails, poison and poisonous gas, as well as vehicle and arson attacks
A – indicates that an arson attack was the only other weapon used
V – indicates that a vehicle was the only other weapon used
E – indicates that explosives of any sort were the only other weapon used
P – indicates that an anaesthetising or deadly substance of any kind was the only other weapon used (includes poisonous gas)

References

workplace military
Rampages
rampage